This is a list of lists of Slovene scientists by field of work.

Natural sciences 
 List of Slovenian astronomers
 List of Slovenian biologists
 List of Slovenian chemists
 List of Slovenian geographers and geologists
 List of Slovenian mathematicians
 List of Slovenian physicists

Social sciences 
 List of Slovenian art historians
 List of Slovenian economists
 List of Slovenian historians
 List of Slovenian linguists and philologists
 List of Slovenian literary historians and critics
 List of Slovenian psychiatrists and psychologists
 List of Slovenian sociologists

See also 
 List of Slovenes

 
Scientists
Slovenian